Horlacher is a surname. Notable people with the surname include:

Cody Horlacher (born 1987), American lawyer and politician
Fred Horlacher (1910–1943), Irish footballer

German-language surnames
Swiss-German surnames
Swiss-language surnames